Lynn Kistler is a physicist known for her research on the magnetosphere that protects Earth from radiation from space.

Education and career 
Kistler has a B.S. in physics from Harvey Mudd College, and an M.S. and a Ph.D. in physics from the University of Maryland. As of 2021, Kistler is a professor of physics and the director of the Space Science Center at the University of New Hampshire. In 2016, Kistler was elected fellow of the American Geophysical Union. The citation recognized her "... prolific seminal contributions to our understanding of the role of heavy terrestrial ions in magnetospheric structure and dynamics."

Research 
Kistler is known for her research on Earth's magnetosphere, where she examines the heavy ions found in the ring current and changes in the flow of O ions during geomagnetic storms. Kistler's research includes the design and testing of instruments placed on satellites to examine processes in the magnetosphere, including the Ion Mass Spectrum Analyzer and instruments within the Solar Orbiter mission.

Selected publications

Awards and honors 
 Fellow, American Geophysical Union (2016)

References

External links 
 

Fellows of the American Geophysical Union
Harvey Mudd College alumni
University System of Maryland alumni
University of New Hampshire faculty
Women physicists
Year of birth missing (living people)
Living people